is a manga series by Buichi Terasawa about a detective named  who gains a cybernetic eye implant that can control any computer system on the planet. The manga has been published in English by ComicsOne and DrMaster.

Reception
Helen McCarthy in 500 Essential Anime Movies calls the plot 'incredibly silly', but praises 'stylish locations' and widely theatrical design ideas'.

References

Further reading

Goku II: Midnight Eye review
Goku Midnight Eye Review by The Nine Hells of Anime Podcast / Anime of Yesteryear Podcast
Goku: Midnight Eye review
The Anime Review: Goku: Midnight Eye

External links
Goku Midnight Eye at ComicsOne

1989 anime OVAs
ComicsOne titles
Cyborg comics
Discotek Media
Madhouse (company)
Seinen manga
Cyberpunk anime and manga